Glossophaginae is a subfamily of leaf-nosed bats.

List of species

Subfamily: Glossophaginae
 Tribe Glossophagini
Genus: Anoura - Geoffroy's long-nosed bats
Anoura aequatoris
Cadena's tailless bat, Anoura cadenai
Tailed tailless bat, Anoura caudifera
Handley's tailless bat, Anoura cultrata
Tube-lipped nectar bat, Anoura fistulata
Geoffroy's tailless bat, Anoura geoffroyi
Broad-toothed tailless bat, Anoura latidens
Luis Manuel's tailless bat, Anoura luismanueli
Genus: Choeroniscus
Godman's long-tailed bat, Choeroniscus godmani
Greater long-tailed bat, Choeroniscus periosus
Minor long-nosed long-tongued bat, Choeroniscus minor
Genus: Choeronycteris
Mexican long-tongued bat (hog-nosed bat), Choeronycteris mexicana
Genus: Dryadonycteris
Dryades bat, Dryadonycteris capixaba
Genus: Glossophaga
Commissaris's long-tongued bat, Glossophaga commissarisi
Gray long-tongued bat, Glossophaga leachii
Miller's long-tongued bat, Glossophaga longirostris
Western long-tongued bat, Glossophaga morenoi
Pallas's long-tongued bat, Glossophaga soricina
Genus: Hylonycteris
Underwood's long-tongued bat, Hylonycteris underwoodi
Genus: Leptonycteris - Saussure's long-nosed bats
Southern long-nosed bat, Leptonycteris curasoae
Big long-nosed bat or Mexican long-nosed bat, Leptonycteris nivalis
Lesser long-nosed bat or Mexican long-nosed bat, Leptonycteris yerbabuenae
Genus: Lichonycteris
Dark long-tongued bat, Lichonycteris obscura
Pale brown long-nosed bat, Lichonycteris degener
Genus: Monophyllus
Insular single leaf bat, Monophyllus plethodon
Leach's single leaf bat, Monophyllus redmani
Genus: Musonycteris
Banana bat (Colima long-nosed bat), Musonycteris harrisoni
Genus: Scleronycteris
Ega long-tongued bat, Scleronycteris ega

References

Phyllostomidae
Mammal subfamilies
Taxa named by Charles Lucien Bonaparte